Greene County is located in the southwestern portion of Ohio. As of the 2020 census, the population was 167,966. Its county seat is Xenia and its largest city is Beavercreek. The county was established on March 24, 1803 and named for General Nathanael Greene, an officer in the Revolutionary War. Greene County is part of the Dayton, OH Metropolitan Statistical Area.

Geography

Adjacent counties
 Clark County (north)
 Madison County (northeast)
 Fayette County (east)
 Clinton County (south)
 Warren County (southwest)
 Montgomery County (west)

National protected area
 Dayton Aviation Heritage National Historical Park (part)

Major highways

Demographics

2000 census
As of the census of 2010, there were 161,573 people, 61,825 households, and 39,160 families living in the county. The population density was 356 people per square mile (138/km2). There were 58,224 housing units at an average density of 140 per square mile (54/km2). The racial makeup of the county was 86.4% White, 7.2% Black or African American, 0.3% Native American, 2.9% Asian, 0.1% Pacific Islander, 0.38% from other races, and 1.66% from two or more races. 1.23% of the population were Hispanic or Latino of any race.

There were 55,312 households, out of which 32.80% had children under the age of 18 living with them, 58.00% were married couples living together, 9.60% had a female householder with no husband present, and 29.20% were non-families. 23.00% of all households were made up of individuals, and 7.70% had someone living alone who was 65 years of age or older. The average household size was 2.53 and the average family size was 3.00.

In the county, the population was spread out, with 23.90% under the age of 18, 13.70% from 18 to 24, 27.00% from 25 to 44, 23.60% from 45 to 64, and 11.80% who were 65 years of age or older. The median age was 36 years. For every 100 females there were 94.80 males. For every 100 females age 18 and over, there were 91.40 males.

The median income for a household in the county was $48,656, and the median income for a family was $57,954. Males had a median income of $42,338 versus $28,457 for females. The per capita income for the county was $23,057. About 5.20% of families and 8.50% of the population were below the poverty line, including 8.70% of those under age 18 and 6.90% of those age 65 or over.

2010 census
As of the 2010 United States census, there were 161,573 people, 62,770 households, and 41,696 families living in the county. The racial makeup of the county was 86.4% white, 7.2% black or African American, 2.9% Asian, 0.3% American Indian, 0.1% Pacific islander, 0.5% from other races, and 2.6% from two or more races. Those of Hispanic or Latino origin made up 2.1% of the population. In terms of ancestry, 26.4% were German, 15.7% were American, 13.0% were Irish, and 10.9% were English.

Of the 62,770 households, 30.1% had children under the age of 18 living with them, 51.9% were married couples living together, 10.6% had a female householder with no husband present, 33.6% were non-families, and 26.5% of all households were made up of individuals. The average household size was 2.43 and the average family size was 2.95. The median age was 37.2 years.

The median income for a household in the county was $56,679 and the median income for a family was $70,817. Males had a median income of $53,614 versus $37,056 for females. The per capita income for the county was $28,328. About 7.8% of families and 11.4% of the population were below the poverty line, including 15.3% of those under age 18 and 5.1% of those age 65 or over.

Politics
Greene County is a Republican stronghold in presidential elections. The only times the county has voted for the Democratic nominee were for Franklin D. Roosevelt in 1936 and Lyndon B. Johnson in 1964, both decisive Democratic victories at the national level.

|}

Government

 Auditor: David Graham (R)
 Coroner: Kevin L. Sharrett, M.D. (R)
 Engineer: Stephanie Ann Goff (R)
 Prosecutor: David Hayes (R)
 Recorder: Eric C. Sears (R)
 Sheriff: Scott J. Anger (R)
 Treasurer: Kraig A. Hagler (R)
 Common Pleas Judge: Hon. Adolfo A. Tornichio (R)
 Common Pleas Judge: Hon. Michael A. Buckwalter (R)
 Domestic Relations Judge: Hon. Cynthia Martin (R)
 Juvenile Court Judge: Hon. Amy Lewis (R)
 Probate Court Judge: Hon. Thomas M. O'Diam (R)
 County Commissioners: Dick Gould (R), Tom Koogler (R), and Rick Perales (R)

Parks
Greene County Parks & Trails manages over 3000 acres of parkland, 62 miles of paved multiuse trails, 36 miles of river trails, and 24 miles of hiking trails.

Education

Higher education
The following colleges and universities are located in Greene County:

Public
 Wright State University, Fairborn
 Central State University, Wilberforce
 Clark State Community College - Greene Center, Beavercreek

Private
 Antioch College, Yellow Springs
 Antioch University Midwest, Yellow Springs
 Cedarville University, Cedarville
 Wilberforce University, Wilberforce

Public schools
 Beavercreek City School District
 Beavercreek High School, Beavercreek (the Beavers)
 Cedar Cliff Local School District
 Cedarville High School, Cedarville (the Indians)
 Fairborn City School District
 Fairborn High School, Fairborn (the Skyhawks)
 Greeneview Local School District
 Greeneview High School, Jamestown (the Rams)
 Sugarcreek Local School District
 Bellbrook High School, Bellbrook (the Golden Eagles)
 Xenia Community City School District
 Xenia High School, Xenia (the Buccaneers)
 Yellow Springs Exempted Village School District
 Yellow Springs High School, Yellow Springs (the Bulldogs)
 Greene County Career Center, Xenia (Vocational school)

Private schools
 Legacy Christian Academy (the Knights)
 St. Brigid School (the Irish)

Communities

Cities
 Beavercreek
 Bellbrook
 Centerville (part)
 Dayton (part)
 Fairborn
 Kettering (part)
 Xenia (county seat)

Villages
 Bowersville
 Cedarville
 Clifton (part)
 Jamestown
 Spring Valley
 Yellow Springs

Townships

 Bath
 Beavercreek
 Caesarscreek
 Cedarville
 Jefferson
 Miami
 New Jasper
 Ross
 Silvercreek
 Spring Valley
 Sugarcreek
 Xenia

https://web.archive.org/web/20160715023447/http://www.ohiotownships.org/township-websites

Census-designated places
 Shawnee Hills
 Wilberforce
 Wright-Patterson Air Force Base

Unincorporated communities

 Byron
 Ferry
 Gladstone
 Goes Station
 Grape Grove
 New Germany
 New Jasper
 Oldtown
 Paintersville
 Roxanna
 Stringtown
 Trebein
 Washington Mills

See also
 National Register of Historic Places listings in Greene County, Ohio

References

External links
 Greene County Website

 
1803 establishments in Ohio
Populated places established in 1803